Paish is a surname. Notable people with the surname include:

Arthur Paish (1874–1948), British cricketer
Geoffrey Paish (1922-2008), British tennis player
George Paish (1867-1957), British economist
John Paish (born 1948), British tennis player
Wilf Paish (1932-2010), British athletic coach